"New Fang" is the debut single by Los Angeles-based rock supergroup Them Crooked Vultures. It was the first track the band worked on. "New Fang" was released as the first single from the band's self-titled debut album (2009). 
The single was released to radio on October 26, 2009. 
It entered the top ten of the Alternative Songs chart, peaking at number 10, and the top twenty on both the Hot Mainstream Rock Tracks (number 13) and Rock Songs (number 14) charts. The song, as performed by the band during a New York concert on October 15, 2009, was described by New York Times writer Nate Chinen as one of the band's "more buoyant tunes, hint[ing] at Southern boogie rock."

The song also won a Grammy Award for Best Hard Rock Performance at the 53rd Grammy Awards on February 13, 2011. It was the last song to win the award before its discontinuation.

Appearances in other media
The song was made available as downloadable content for Rock Band for the Xbox 360 on November 17, 2009, for Nintendo Wii on November 24, 2009, and for PlayStation 3 on December 3, 2009.

Chart performance

Weekly charts

Year-end charts

References

Them Crooked Vultures songs
2009 debut singles
Songs written by John Paul Jones (musician)
Songs written by Dave Grohl
Grammy Award for Best Hard Rock Performance
2009 songs
Interscope Records singles
Columbia Records singles
Songs written by Josh Homme

he:New Fang